Valeriy Ihorovych Lebed (born 5 January 1989) is a Ukrainian professional footballer who plays as a midfielder.

External links
 
 

1989 births
Living people
Ukrainian footballers
Footballers from Kharkiv
FC Shakhtar-3 Donetsk players
FC Olimpik Donetsk players
Ukrainian Premier League players
Ukrainian First League players
Ukrainian Second League players
Doping cases in association football
Ukrainian sportspeople in doping cases
NK Veres Rivne players
Association football midfielders
PFC Sumy players